Andre Agassi was the defending champion but lost in the third round to David Wheaton.

Brad Gilbert won in the final 7–5, 6–0 against Jim Pugh.

Seeds
A champion seed is indicated in bold text while text in italics indicates the round in which that seed was eliminated.

  Andre Agassi (third round)
  Michael Chang (quarterfinals)
  Brad Gilbert (champion)
  Kevin Curren (second round)
  Amos Mansdorf (second round)
  Jay Berger (second round)
  Yannick Noah (second round)
  Dan Goldie (third round)
  Jim Courier (quarterfinals)
  Johan Kriek (third round)
  Paul Annacone (second round)
  Robert Seguso (quarterfinals)
  Paul Chamberlin (first round)
  Jim Pugh (final)
  Derrick Rostagno (third round)
  Scott Davis (second round)

Draw

Finals

Top half

Section 1

Section 2

Bottom half

Section 3

Section 4

References
 1989 Volvo International Draw (Archived 2009-06-09)

Singles